Coulor is a village and gold mine in French Guiana, in the commune of Mana. The gold mine is being exploited by the Espérance Mining Company. The mine measures 113 km2.

See also
 Délices
 Montagne d'Or mine

References

Gold mines in French Guiana
Mana, French Guiana
Villages in French Guiana